Deborah Duchene (born July 3, 1962 in Montreal, Quebec, Canada) is a former film, television, and stage actress. She grew up in the U.S. and Canada, the daughter of a Baptist minister. She has appeared in film, stage and television with her most notable role being Janette in the Forever Knight series. She graduated from McGill University. One of her brothers serves in the U.S. Army. She has retired from acting, lives in Toronto, Ontario, Canada, and currently attends the University of Toronto majoring in music to become a teacher.

Filmography

Film

Television

Stage performances
A Funny Thing Happened On The Way to the Forum (1981)
Agnes of God
Canadian Gothic (1985)
Dracula (1989)
Hello From Bertha (1985)
Lu Ann Hampton Laverty Oberlander
The Playboy of the Western World (1984)
Triptych (1992)

Awards and nominations

External links
 Deborah Duchene''

1962 births
Canadian Baptists
Canadian film actresses
Living people
McGill University alumni
Actresses from Montreal
Canadian television actresses
Canadian stage actresses
20th-century Canadian actresses